Zeuktophyllum is a succulent plant in the family Aizoaceae.

References

Aizoaceae
Aizoaceae genera
Taxa named by N. E. Brown